The 1979 World Fencing Championships were held in Melbourne, Australia.

Medal table

Medal summary

Men's events

Women's events

References

World Fencing Championships
International fencing competitions hosted by Australia
World Fencing Championships
1970s in Melbourne
Sports competitions in Melbourne
World Fencing Championships